Evidence-based design (EBD) is the process of constructing a building or physical environment based on scientific research to achieve the best possible outcomes. Evidence-based design is especially important in evidence-based medicine, where research has shown that environment design can affect patient outcomes. It is also used in architecture, interior design, landscape architecture, facilities management, education, and urban planning. Evidence-based design is part of the larger movement towards evidence-based practices.

Background 
Evidence-based design (EBD) was popularized by the seminal study by Ulrich (1984) that showed the impact of a window view on patient recovery. Studies have since examined the relationships between design of the physical environment of hospitals with outcomes in health, the results of which show how the physical environment can lower the incidence of nosocomial infections, medical errors, patient falls, and staff injuries; and reduce stress of facility users, improve safety and productivity, reduce resource waste, and enhance sustainability.

Evidence in EBD may include a wide range of sources of knowledge, from systematic literature reviews to practice guidelines and expert opinions. Evidence-based design was first defined as "the deliberate attempt to base design decisions on the best available research evidence" and that "an evidence-based designer, together with an informed client, makes decisions based on the best available information from research and project evaluations". The Center for Heath Design (CHD), a non-profit organization that supports healthcare and design professionals to improve the understanding and application of design that influence the performance of healthcare, patient satisfaction, staff productivity and safety, base their model on the importance of working in partnership with the client and interdisciplinary team to foster understanding of the client, preferences and resources.

The roots of evidence-based design could go back to 1860 when Florence Nightingale identified fresh air as "the very first canon of nursing," and emphasized the importance of quiet, proper lighting, warmth and clean water. Nightingale applied statistics to nursing, notably with "Diagram of the causes of mortality in the army in the East". This statistical study led to advances in sanitation, although the germ theory of disease was not yet fully accepted. The evidence-based design movement began much later in the 1970s with Archie Cochranes's book Effectiveness and Efficiency: Random Reflections on Health Services. to collect, codify, and disseminate "evidence" gathered in randomised controlled trials relative to the built environment. A 1984 study by Roger Ulrich found that surgical patients with a view of nature suffered fewer complications, used less pain medication and were discharged sooner than those who looked out on a brick wall; and laid the foundation for what has now become a discipline known as evidence-based design. Studies exist about the psychological effects of lighting, carpeting and noise on critical-care patients, and evidence links physical environment with improvement of patients and staff safety, wellness and satisfaction. Architectural researchers have studied the impact of hospital layout on staff effectiveness, and social scientists studied guidance and wayfinding. Architectural researchers have conducted post-occupancy evaluations (POE) to provide advice on improving building design and quality. While the EBD process is particularly suited to healthcare, it may be also used in other fields for positive health outcomes and provision of healing environments.

Evidence-based design for healthcare facilities 
There is a growing awareness among healthcare professionals and medical planners for the need to create patient-centered environments that can help patients and family cope with the stress that accompanies illness. There is also growing supporting research and evidence through various studies that have shown both the influence of well-designed environments on positive patient health outcomes, and poor design on negative effects including longer hospital stays.

Using biophilic design concepts in interior environments is increasingly argued to have positive impacts on health and well-being through improving direct and indirect experiences of nature. Numerous studies have demonstrated improved patient health outcomes through environmental measures; exposing patients to nature has been shown to produce substantial alleviation of pain, and limited research also suggests that patients experience less pain when exposed to higher levels of daylight in their hospital rooms. Patients have an increased need for sleep during illness, but suffer from poor sleep when hospitalised. Approaches such as single-bed rooms and reduced noise have been shown to improve patient sleep. Natural daylight in patient rooms help to maintain circadian rhythms and improve sleep.

According to Heerwagen, an environmental psychologist, medical models of health integrate behavioral, social, psychological, and mental processes. Contact with nature and daylight has been found to enhance emotional functioning; drawing on research from studies (EBD) on well-being outcomes and building features. Positive feelings such as calmness increase, while anxiety, anger, or other negative emotions diminish with views of nature. In contrast there is also convincing evidence that stress could be worsened and ineffective in fostering restoration in built environments that lack nature. 

Few studies have shown the restorative effects of gardens for stressed patients, families and staff. Behavioural observation and interview methods in post occupancy studies of hospital gardens have shown a faster recovery from stress by nearly all garden users. Limited evidence suggest increased benefits when these gardens contain foliage, flowers, water, pleasant nature sounds, such as birds and water.

Related approaches

Performance-based building design
EBD is closely related to performance-based building design (PBBD) practices. As an approach to design, PBBD tries to create clear statistical relationships between design decisions and satisfaction levels demonstrated by the building systems. Like EBD, PBBD uses research evidence to predict performance related to design decisions.

The decision-making process is non-linear, since the building environment is a complex system. Choices cannot be based on cause-and-effect predictions; instead, they depend on variable components and mutual relationships. Technical systems, such as heating, ventilation and air-conditioning, have interrelated design choices and related performance requirements (such as energy use, comfort and use cycles) are variable components.

Evidence-based medicine
Evidence-based medicine (EBM) is a systematic process of evaluating scientific research which is used as the basis for clinical treatment choices. Sackett, Rosenberg, Gray, Haynes and Richardson argue that "evidence-based medicine is the conscientious, explicit and judicious use of current best evidence in making decisions about the care of individual patients". It is used in the healthcare industry to convince decision-makers to invest the time and money to build better buildings, realizing strategic business advantages as a result. As medicine has become increasingly evidence-based, healthcare design uses EBD to link hospitals' physical environments with healthcare outcomes.

Research-informed design
Research-informed design (RID) is a less-developed concept that is commonly misunderstood and used synonymously with EBD, although they are different. It can be defined as the process of applying credible research in integration with the project team to inform the environmental design to achieve the project goals. Credible research here, includes qualitative, quantitative, and mixed methods approaches with the highest standards of rigor suitable for their methodology.
It is important to understand that the literature for "research-informed" practices comes from education and not from the healthcare disciplines. The process involves application of the outcomes from literature review and empirical investigation to inform design during the design phase, given the constraints; and to share the process and the lessons learnt just like in EDB.

Research and accreditation
As EBD is supported by research, many healthcare organizations are adopting its principles with the guidance of evidence-based designers. The Center for Health Design developed the Pebble Project, a joint research effort by CHD and selected healthcare providers on the effect of building environments on patients and staff. Health Environment Research & Design journal and the Health Care Advisory Board are additional sources of information and database on EBD.

The Evidence Based Design Accreditation and Certification (EDAC) program was introduced in 2009 by The Center for Health Design to provide internationally recognized certification and promote the use of EBD in healthcare building projects, making EBD an accepted and credible approach to improving healthcare outcomes. EDAC identifies those experienced in EBD and teaches about the research process: identifying, hypothesizing, implementing, gathering and reporting data associated with a healthcare project.

Process 
There are four components to evidence-based design:
Gather qualitative and quantitative intelligence
 Map strategic, cultural and research goals
Hypothesize outcomes, innovate, and implement translational design
 Measure and share outcomes

Meta-analysis template for literature review 
In his book Evidence-based Policy: A Realistic Perspective, Ray Pawson suggests a meta-analysis template which may be applied to EBD. With this protocol, the field will be able to provide designers with a source for evidence-based design.

A systematic review process should follow five steps:
 Formulating the review question 
 Identifying and collecting evidence
 Evaluating the quality of the evidence
 Extracting, processing and systematizing data
 Disseminating findings

Conceptual model 
According to Hamilton, architects have a responsibility in translation of research in the field, and its application in informing designs. He further illustrates a conceptual model architects could use, that identifies four levels of addressing research and methods base on varying levels of commitment: 
 Level 1
 Informed design decisions based on available literature on environmental research, based on applicability, such as the use of a state of the art technology or strategy based on the physical setting of the project
 Level 2
 Design decisions based on predictive performance and measurable outcomes, rather than subjective decisions based on random choice
 Level 3
 Results reported publicly, with the objective of moving information on the methods and results moving information beyond the design team, 
 The peer review, makes the process more robust, as it could include varying perspectives from those who may or may not agree with the findings
 Level 4
 Publishing findings in peer-reviewed journals
 Collaborating with academic and social scientists

Working model 
A white paper (series 3/5) from the Center for Health Design presents a working model to help designers implement EBD decision-making. The primary goal is providing a healing environment; positive outcomes depend on three investments:
 Designed infrastructure, including the built environment and technology
 Re-engineered clinical and administrative practices to maximize infrastructure investment
 Leadership to maximize human and infrastructure investments

All three investments depend on existing research.

Strategies 
A white paper from the Center for Health Design identifies ten strategies to aid EBD decision-making:
Start with problems. Identify the problems the project is trying to solve and for which the facility design plays an important role (for example, adding or upgrading technology, expanding services to meet growing market demand, replacing aging infrastructure)
Use an integrated multidisciplinary approach with consistent senior involvement, ensuring that everyone with problem-solving tools is included. It is essential to stimulate synergy between different community to maximize efforts, outcomes and interchanges.
Maintain a patient- and family-centered approach; patient and family experiences are key to defining aims and assessing outcomes.
Focus on financial operations past the first-cost impact, exploring the cost-effectiveness of design options over time and considering multi-year investment returns.
Apply disciplined participation and criteria management. These processes use decision-making tools such as SWOT analysis, analytic hierarchy processes and decision trees which may also be used in design (particularly of technical aspects such as structure, fire safety or energy use).
Establish incentive-linked criteria to increase design-team motivation and involve end users with checklists, surveys and simulations.
Use strategic partnerships to create new products with hospital-staff expertise and influence.
Encourage simulation and testing, assuming the patient's perspective when making lighting and energy models and computer visualizations.
Use a lifecycle perspective (30–50 years) from planning to product, exploring the lifecycle return on investment of design strategies for safety and workforce outcomes.
Overcommunicate. Positive outcomes are connected with the involvement of clinical staff and community members with meetings, newsletters, webcams and other tools.

Tools 
Evidence-based design has been applied to efficacy measurements of a building's design, and is usually done at the post-construction stage as a part of a post-occupancy evaluation (POE). The POE assesses strengths and weaknesses of design decisions in relation to human behaviour in a built environment. Issues include acoustics, odor control, vibration, lighting and user-friendliness, and are binary-choice (acceptable or unacceptable). Other research techniques, such as observation, photography, checklists, interviews, surveys and focus groups, supplement traditional design-research methods.
Assessment tools have been developed by The Center for Health Design and the Picker Institute to help healthcare managers and designers gather information on consumer needs, assess their satisfaction and measure quality improvements:
 The Patient Environmental Checklist assesses an existing facility's strong and weak points. Specific environmental features are evaluated by patients and their families on a 5-point scale, and the checklist quickly identifies areas needing improvement.
 The Patient Survey gathers information on patients' experiences with the built environment. The questions range is wide, since patients' priorities may differ significantly from those of administrators or designers.
 Focus Groups with consumers learn about specific needs and generate ideas for future solutions.

References

 Cama, R., "Patient room advances and controversies: Are you in the evidence-based healthcare design game?", Healthcare Design, March 2009.
 
 Hall, C.R., "CHD rolls out evidence-based design accreditation and certification", Health Facilities Management, July 2009.
 Kirk, Hamilton D., "Research Informed Design & Outcomes for Healthcare" in Evidence Based Hospital Design Forum, Washington, January 2009.
 Stankos, M. and Scharz, B., "Evidence-Based Design in Healthcare: A Theoretical Dilemma", IDRP Interdisciplinary Design and Research e-Journal, Volume I, Issue I (Design and Health), January 2007.
 Ulrich, R.S., "Effects of Healthcare Environmental Design on Medical Outcomes" in Design & Health – The therapeutic benefits of design, proceedings of the 2nd Annual International Congress on Design and Health. Karolinska Institute, Stockholm, June 2000.
 Webster, L. and Steinke, C., "Evidence-based design: A new direction for health care". Design Quarterly, Winter 2009
 Sadler, B.L., Dubose, J.R., Malone, E.B. and Zimring, C.M., "The business case for building better hospitals through evidence based design". White Paper Series 1/5, Evidence-Based Design Resources for Healthcare Executives, Center for Health Design, September 2008.
 Ulrich, R.S., Zimring, C.M., Zhu, X., Dubose, J., Seo, H.B., Choi, Y.S., Quan, X. and Joseph, A., "A review of the research literature on evidence based healthcare design", White Paper Series 5/5, Evidence-Based Design Resources for Healthcare Executives, Center for Health Design, September 2008.

Further reading
 A Visual Reference to Evidence-Based Design by Jain Malkin.
 Study Guide 1: An Introduction to Evidence-Based Design: Exploring Healthcare and Design.
 Study Guide 2: Building the Evidence-Base: Understanding Research in Helathcare Design.
 Study Guide 3: Integrating Evidence-Based Design: Practicing the Healthcare Design Process.
 A Practitioner's Guide to Evidence-Based Design by Debra D. Harris, PhD, Anjali Joseph, PhD, Franklin Becker, PhD, Kirk Hamilton, FAIA, FACHA, Mardelle McCuskey Shepley, AIA, D.Arch.
 Evidence-Based Design for Multiple Building Types by D. Kirk Hamilton and David H. Watkins.
 Stout, Chris E. and Hayes, Randy A. The evidence-based practice: methods, models, and tools for mental health professionals. John Wiley and Sons, January 2005.
 Ulrich, R., Quan, X., Zimring, C., Joseph, A. and, Choudhary, R., "The Role of the Physical Environment in the Hospital of the 21st Century". Report to the Center for Health Design, September 2004.
 Cama, R., (2009). Evidence-Based Healthcare Design. Hoboken, New Jersey: John Wiley & Sons, Inc. 
 Phiri, M. (2015). Design Tools for Evidence-Based Healthcare Design. Abingdon & New York: Routledge.
 Phiri, M. & Chen, B. (2014). Sustainability and Evidence-Based Design in Healthcare Estate. Heidelberg: Springer.

External links
 The Center for Health Design
 Role of the Physical Environment in the Hospital of the 21st Century: Report published by The Center for Health Design in 2004 summarizing evidence-based design research for healthcare
 InformeDesign: Research database of studies linking environment to outcomes
 Center for Health Systems and Design
 Picker Institute
 Tulane Center for Evidence-Based Global Health

Health care quality
Decision-making
Health informatics
Evidence-based practices